Deborah "Debbie" Jones-Walker (also known as Debbie Jones; born March 23, 1953 in Edmonton as Debbie Orr) is a Canadian former curler.

She competed at the 1988 Winter Olympics when curling was a demonstration sport. The Canadian women's team won the gold medal, defeating Sweden in the final.

Jones-Walker was inducted into the Canadian Curling Hall of Fame in 1991.

She is an honorary member of the North Shore Winter Club and was inducted into the BC Sports Hall of Fame in 1990.

Originally from Winnipeg, she lived in British Columbia from 1978 to 1990.

Teams

Women's

Mixed

References

External links

Living people
1953 births
Curlers from Winnipeg
Curlers from British Columbia
Curlers from Edmonton
Canadian women curlers
Curlers at the 1988 Winter Olympics
Olympic curlers of Canada
World curling champions
Canadian women's curling champions
Canadian mixed curling champions